The Anglican Church in North America (ACNA) is a Christian denomination in the Anglican tradition in the United States and Canada. It also includes ten congregations in Mexico, two mission churches in Guatemala, and a missionary diocese in Cuba. Headquartered in Ambridge, Pennsylvania, the church reported 974 congregations and 122,450 members in 2021. The first archbishop of the ACNA was Robert Duncan, who was succeeded by Foley Beach in 2014.

The ACNA was founded in 2009 by former members of the Episcopal Church in the United States and the Anglican Church of Canada who were dissatisfied with liberal doctrinal and social teachings in their former churches, which they considered contradictory to traditional Anglican belief. Prior to 2009, these conservative Anglicans had begun to receive support from a number of Anglican churches (or provinces) outside of North America, especially in the Global South. Several Episcopal dioceses and many individual parishes in both Canada and the United States voted to transfer their allegiance to Anglican provinces in South America and Africa. In 2009, many Anglican groups which had withdrawn from the two North American provinces united to form the Anglican Church in North America.

Unlike the Episcopal Church and the Anglican Church of Canada, the ACNA is not a member province of the Anglican Communion. From its inception, the Anglican Church in North America has sought full communion with those provinces of the Anglican Communion "that hold and maintain the Historic Faith, Doctrine, Sacraments and Discipline of the One, Holy, Catholic, and Apostolic Church";  and the church maintains full communion with the Anglican Global South primates.

The ACNA has attempted to incorporate the full spectrum of conservative Anglicanism within Canada and the United States. As a result, it accommodates Anglo-Catholic, charismatic, and evangelical theological orientations. It also includes those who oppose and those who support the ordination of women. Women can serve as clergy members in some dioceses, while other dioceses maintain an exclusively male clergy. Women are ineligible to serve as bishops. This disagreement over the ordination of women has led to "impaired communion" among some dioceses. The ACNA defines Christian marriage exclusively as a lifelong union between a man and a woman and holds that there are only two expressions of faithful sexuality: lifelong marriage between a man and a woman or abstinence. The church opposes abortion and euthanasia.

History
The Anglican Church in North America was founded by Anglicans who had left the Anglican Church of Canada and the Episcopal Church in the United States over concerns that the teaching of those churches had grown more liberal. The new body charged that the two existing churches "have increasingly accommodated and incorporated un-Biblical, un-Anglican practices and teaching".

Two major events that contributed to ACNA's formation both involved human sexuality. The first was the 2002 decision of the Diocese of New Westminster in Canada to authorize a rite of blessing for same-sex unions; the second was the General Convention's ratification of the election of Gene Robinson, an openly gay non-celibate man, as Bishop of New Hampshire the following year. Conservative opposition to both the Episcopal Church's 1979 edition of the Book of Common Prayer and to the ordination of women priests had led to the founding of an earlier wave of independent Anglican churches, often called the Continuing Anglican movement.

Common Cause Partnership

In June 2004, the leaders of six conservative Anglican organizations—the Anglican Communion Network, the Reformed Episcopal Church, the Anglican Mission in America, Forward in Faith North America, the Anglican Province of America, and the American Anglican Council—sent a public letter to the Archbishop of Canterbury, pledging "to make common cause for the gospel of Jesus Christ and common cause for a united, missionary and orthodox Anglicanism in North America". They called their alliance the Common Cause Partnership and drafted a theological statement in 2006.

In September 2007, fifty-one bishops met in Pittsburgh, Pennsylvania, to discern direction and to bind themselves constitutionally, saying they intended to found an "Anglican union". Some of the bishops present were foreign bishops, including a retired archbishop. Features of note from the result of the initial meeting include a broad sharing of clergy between the varied groups, an intention to be a "missionary" or church-planting entity, and an intention, after a brief time, to seek international organizational recognition.

Key members of the partnership participated in the June 2008 meeting of conservative Anglicans in Jerusalem, the Global Anglican Future Conference, which in turn prompted the formation of the Global Fellowship of Confessing Anglicans. A final statement issued by the conference stated that: "we believe the time is now ripe for the formation of a province in North America for the federation currently known as Common Cause Partnership to be recognised by the Primates' Council" of the Anglican Communion.

The Anglican Province of America participated in the partnership until July 2008.

Establishment
In December 2008, the partnership met in West Chicago, Illinois, as a constitutional convention to form a "separate ecclesiastical structure in North America" for Anglican faithful distinct from the Episcopal Church and the Anglican Church of Canada. There the partnership's executive committee approved a provisional constitution and canons for the new church which were to be submitted for formal adoption at the new church's first Provincial Assembly.

The members of the Common Cause Partnership at the founding of the ACNA were:

 The American Anglican Council
 The Anglican Coalition in Canada
 The Anglican Communion Network
 The Anglican Mission in the Americas
 The Anglican Network in Canada
 The Convocation of Anglicans in North America
 Forward in Faith North America
 The Missionary Convocation of Kenya
 The Missionary Convocation of the Southern Cone
 The Missionary Convocation of Uganda
 The Reformed Episcopal Church
 The Reformed Communion

Inaugural assembly
On June 22, 2009, delegates of the ACNA's founding bodies met at St. Vincent's Cathedral in Bedford, Texas, for an inaugural provincial assembly to ratify its constitution and canons. At this meeting, a number of major steps were taken to officially establish the new denomination, including the election of Robert Duncan, bishop of the Anglican Diocese of Pittsburgh, as archbishop.

Rick Warren, a leading American evangelical, and Metropolitan Jonah Paffhausen, leader of the Orthodox Church in America, addressed the audience. There were nine provinces in the Anglican Communion that sent official representatives to the assembly, namely the Church of the Province of West Africa, the Church of Nigeria, the Church of Uganda, the Anglican Church of Kenya, represented by Archbishop Benjamin Nzimbi, the Anglican Province of the Southern Cone, including Archbishop Gregory Venables, the Episcopal Church in Jerusalem and the Middle East, the Church of the Province of Myanmar, the Church of the Province of South East Asia and the Church of the Province of Rwanda.

Other ecumenical observers included Bishop Walter Grundorf of the Anglican Province of America, Samuel Nafzger of the Lutheran Church–Missouri Synod, and Bishop Kevin Vann of the Roman Catholic Diocese of Fort Worth.

Leaders from three Anglican provinces, John Chew of the Church of the Province of South East Asia, Archbishop Peter Jensen of the Anglican Diocese of Sydney and the Fellowship of Confessing Anglicans and Mouneer Anis, Presiding Bishop of the Episcopal Church in Jerusalem and the Middle East, formally announced support for the ACNA. From England, Bishop Wallace Benn and Archdeacon Michael Lawson sent greetings from the Church of England Evangelical Council.

Anglican Mission and PEARUSA
The Anglican Mission in the Americas was a founding member of the Anglican Church in North America and, at the same time, maintained its status as a mission of the Church of the Province of Rwanda. This "dual citizenship" was defined by protocol among the Province of Rwanda, the Anglican Mission, and the ACNA.

However, in a May 18, 2010, communiqué, the Anglican Mission announced its decision to transition from full ACNA membership to "ministry partner" status, a designation provided for in the governing structure of the ACNA, and remain a part of the Rwandan province. Reasons cited for the change were that the "dual citizenship" model had caused "significant confusion within the Anglican Mission and the ACNA regarding membership in two provinces, and more importantly, is inconsistent with the Constitution and Canons of the Province of the Anglican Church in Rwanda".

On December 20, 2011, Archbishop Duncan announced that, due to the resignation of the majority of Anglican Mission bishops from the Province of Rwanda on December 5, the Anglican Mission had lost its "ministry partner" status with the ACNA and that most of AMiA's bishops had lost their status in the ACNA's College of Bishops. Archbishop Onesphore Rwaje of the Anglican Church of Rwanda and Archbishop Duncan of the Anglican Church in North America issued a Joint Communiqué on April 28, 2012, to address the future of the AMiA. Meanwhile, the House of the Bishops of Rwanda decided to establish the Missionary District in North America (PEARUSA) to pursue the same work in the United States. The AMiA members were given three alternatives: join the PEARUSA, join another Anglican jurisdiction through letters dimissory, or remain in the AMiA. A deadline of August 31, 2012, was established for the clergy and the congregations of the AMiA to decide their future. On April 29, 2012, Archbishop Henri Isingoma expressed his official approval for the temporary admission of the AMiA at the Anglican Church of Congo until its future was clarified. Bishop Chuck Murphy, of the AMiA, expressed his will that the fracture between the AMiA and the ACNA could be solved in an answer letter to Archbishop Duncan, on September 8, 2012.

On August 14, 2014, it was announced the reopening of conversations between ACNA and AMiA "to discuss broken relationships, and to find ways that produce a faithful witness to Christ that has been undermined in the past". The meeting in which these conversations were started was attended by representatives of both ACNA and AMiA, including Archbishop Foley Beach and Bishop Philip Jones, who replaced Chuck Murphy in December 2013.

PEARUSA was a missionary district with equivalent status to a diocese. Upon the unanimous vote of ACNA's Provincial Council on June 21, 2016, PEARUSA was fully transferred to ACNA with two of the three former PEARUSA networks (Mid-Atlantic and Northeast, West) becoming full ACNA dioceses known respectively as the Anglican Diocese of Christ Our Hope and the Anglican Diocese of the Rocky Mountains. The former PEARUSA Southeast network did not become a full, separate ACNA diocese. According to a decision that had been reached at their clergy meeting and released on February 8, 2016, the 20 parishes of PEARUSA Southeast were folded into the already existing ACNA dioceses.

Other dioceses
The Reformed Episcopal Diocese of the West became a convocation at the Missionary Diocese of All Saints, in April 2016, due to their small size. The Diocese of Western Canada and Alaska, who had two parishes in British Columbia, and also included the Missionary District of Cuba, was extinct and incorporated in the Diocese of Mid-America, for similar reasons.

The ACNA and the Diocese of South Carolina, which had withdrawn from the Episcopal Church in October 2012 and was under the provisional primatial oversight of the Global South, held a two-day meeting on April 28–29, 2015, at St. Christopher Camp and Conference Center in South Carolina for conversations and examining the "possible compatibility of the ecclesiologies" of both churches. The Diocese of South Carolina Affiliation Task Force recommended the affiliation to the ACNA at their 225th Diocesan Convention, held in Bluffton, on March 12, 2016. The affiliation required approval by two future conventions of the diocese. The Diocese of South Carolina voted unanimously to affiliate with ACNA at their 226th Convention, held in Summerville, on March 11, 2017. ACNA's Provincial Council voted also unanimously to formally receive the Diocese of South Carolina at ACNA's Third Provincial Assembly, meeting in Wheaton, Illinois, on June 27, 2017.

Convocation of Anglicans in North America (CANA)
After the formation of the ACNA, the Church of Nigeria (Anglican Communion) entered into letters of agreement to formalize relationship between the two provinces. The most recent agreement signed by the ACNA and the Church of Nigeria related to three of the four dioceses that resulted from the Convocation of Anglicans in North America activity in the United States. The agreement signed on March 12, 2019, allowed for the Missionary Diocese of the Trinity, the Missionary Diocese of CANA East, and the Missionary Diocese of CANA West to decide their own provincial affiliation. This agreement became necessary as the result of a dispute generated by the election by the Church of Nigeria of four suffragan bishops for the Missionary Diocese of the Trinity, composed mostly of Nigerian expatriates in the United States, without consultation with the ACNA College of Bishops. Until this time, the Church of Nigeria had allowed all four CANA dioceses to be full participating members of the ACNA. On May 21, 2019, the Missionary Diocese of CANA East announced its decision to withdraw from the Church of Nigeria to become solely a diocese of the Anglican Church in North America, with the new name of the Anglican Diocese of the Living Word. The Diocese of CANA West announced their decision to remain a diocese of the Church of Nigeria on May 23, 2019, followed by the Missionary Diocese of the Trinity on the same day. The dioceses remaining with the Church of Nigeria are, by the agreement, considered ministry partners (a formal canonical status) of the ACNA. The fourth diocese, the Diocese of the Armed Forces and Chaplaincy (CANA), which had become the Jurisdiction of the Armed Forces and Chaplaincy (ACNA) in 2014 by a previous letter of agreement between the Church of Nigeria and the ACNA, was unaffected by this latter agreement since the previous agreement regarding Anglican Chaplains had been solidified through changes in the Canons of the ACNA. The Jurisdiction of the Armed Forces and Chaplaincy continues to function as a full diocesan entity of the ACNA, and in concordat with the Church of Nigeria (CANA).

Impaired communion
Bishop Jack Iker, bishop of the Diocese of Fort Worth—one of the founding members of ACNA—on 4 November 2017 announced that his diocese was in impaired communion with the ACNA dioceses that ordained women. He said: "Most ACNA bishops and dioceses are opposed to women priests, but as it presently stands, the ACNA Constitution says each diocese can decide if it will ordain women priests or not. We now need to work with other dioceses to amend the Constitution to remove this provision". He continued:

Beliefs

In its Fundamental Declarations, the Anglican Church in North America declares itself part of the One, Holy, Catholic, and Apostolic Church, confessing Jesus Christ to be the only way to God the Father. Consistent with this, it identifies the following seven elements as characteristic of the "Anglican Way" and essential for membership:

The Bible is the inspired word of God, containing all things necessary for salvation, and is the final authority and unchangeable standard for Christian faith and life.
Baptism and the Lord's Supper are sacraments ordained by Christ and are to be ministered with unfailing use of his words of institution and the elements ordained by him.
The historic episcopate is an inherent part of the apostolic faith and practice, and therefore integral to the fullness and unity of the Body of Christ.
The church affirms the historic faith of the undivided church as declared in the three ecumenical (catholic) creeds: the Apostles', the Nicene, and the Athanasian.
Concerning the seven Councils of the undivided church, it affirms the teaching of the first four Ecumenical Councils and the Christological clarifications of the fifth, sixth and seventh councils, in so far as they are agreeable to the Bible.
The 1662 Book of Common Prayer and its ordinal is a standard for Anglican doctrine and discipline and, with the editions before it, the standard for the Anglican tradition of worship.
"[T]he Thirty-Nine Articles of Religion of 1571, taken in their literal and grammatical sense, [express] the Anglican response to certain doctrinal issues controverted at that time, and [express] fundamental principles of authentic Anglican belief."

In addition to the 1662 edition of the Book of Common Prayer, the ACNA has authorized the use of later versions, including the 1928 and 1979 versions produced by the Episcopal Church and the 1962 version produced by the Anglican Church of Canada. In 2013, the College of Bishops approved on a trial basis Texts for Common Prayer, a collection of liturgies made specifically for the Anglican Church in North America. Texts for Common Prayer includes morning prayer, evening prayer, the Eucharist or Lord's Supper, and an ordinal. In 2014, the ACNA also released a catechism for trial use, To Be a Christian: An Anglican Catechism, the Approved Edition of which was published in 2020. The new Book of Common Prayer of ACNA was released in 2019. The Calendar of Saints of ACNA was issued in 2017.

The ACNA has Anglo-Catholic, evangelical, and charismatic members and is more theologically conservative than the Episcopal Church and the Anglican Church of Canada. The church allows dioceses to decide if they will or will not ordain women as priests, although it does not permit women to become bishops. Concerning marriage, it holds that it is between one man and one woman; therefore, it opposes same sex unions. The ACNA opposes abortion and euthanasia, proclaiming "all members and clergy are called to promote and respect the sanctity of every human life from conception to natural death". The ACNA is associated with Anglicans for Life for promotion of the pro-life ministry. In 2018, ACNA Archbishop Foley Beach signed a letter with several other church leaders stating gender cannot be separated from one's sex as male or female.

Structure

The Anglican Church in North America is structured as a self-governing, multinational ecclesiastical province. The province's polity is described in its constitution and canon law. The basic level of organization is the local congregation. Each congregation is part of a diocese led by a bishop. Dioceses are self-governing bodies that operate according to their own diocesan canon law (as long as this is consistent with the provincial constitution), and they are able to leave the province at any time if they so choose.

The ACNA is a conciliar church in which both clergy and laity participate in church governance. Every five years, between 250 and 300 diocesan delegates meet as a representative body called the Provincial Assembly. Each diocese is represented by its bishop, two clergy delegates, and two lay delegates. In addition, a diocese receives one additional clergy delegate and one additional lay delegate for every 1,000 constituents, calculated by average attendance at Sunday church services. Dioceses also send youth representatives between the ages of 16 and 26, and these representatives have full voting rights. The Provincial Assembly must approve all constitutional amendments and new canons before they go into effect. Other duties of the assembly include deliberating on church affairs and making recommendations to the provincial governing bodies on such matters.

The ACNA's governing body is the Provincial Council. The council meets every June and is responsible for enacting policy, approving a budget, and recommending changes to the constitution and canons. Each diocese selects a bishop, a clergy member, and two lay persons to represent it on the council. The council itself may also appoint up to six other persons as members, bringing the total number to around 140 members. Council members serve five-year terms. The Provincial Council is led by an executive committee, which sets the council's agenda and serves as the church's board of directors. The executive committee's 12 members are divided equally between clergy and laity. In addition to meeting three times a year in person, they communicate regularly by conference call.

All bishops in active ministry are members of the College of Bishops. The college elects the archbishop, the presiding officer and primate of the church, who convenes the Provincial Assembly, the Provincial Council, and the College of Bishops. The college also has authority to approve diocesan elections of bishops, or in some cases actually elect bishops. There are 50 active bishops sitting in the college. The archbishop has a cabinet composed of leading bishops within the church which functions as a council of advice. The Provincial Tribunal is an ecclesiastical court empowered to rule on constitutional and canonical disputes.

Local congregations hold their own property and the province disavows any claim on the property of local congregations. Existing property-holding arrangements within the founding member entities are not affected by their relation to the province. The province also disavows any authority to control the member entities' policies regarding the question of the ordination of women as deacons or priests.

The constitution and canons specify that other non-member groups (such as a seminary, monastic order or ministry organization, or a diocese, congregation or other entity) may be considered for association as ministry partners or affiliated ministries. These affiliated groups may have representation in church gatherings as determined by the archbishop and may withdraw from affiliation or have their affiliation ended with or without cause. ACNA affiliated ministries include Anglican Global Mission Partners (a missionary organization), Anglican Relief and Development Fund, and Anglican 1000 (a church planting initiative).

In 2021, Foley Beach designated Christ Church Plano, one of the largest churches in the ACNA to serve as pro-cathedral for the province under Beach's personal oversight as archbishop. Christ Church hosted the investiture of Robert Duncan as the first archbishop and the ACNA province-wide assembly in 2019.

Dioceses and statistics

In 2019, the Anglican Church in North America reported 972 congregations with a membership of 127,624 and an average Sunday attendance of 84,310 people. The primate of the ACNA, Archbishop Foley Beach, and church staff identified the departure of two dioceses from the Convocation of Anglicans in North America as the primary cause of the decline in membership and attendance. In 2020, the denominational statistics reported 972 congregations, no change from 2019, 126,760 members, and an average Sunday attendance of 83,119 people. In 2022, using statistics from 2021, the ACNA reported 974 congregations, a slight increase, 122,450 members, and an average Sunday attendance of 73,832 from its highest two months; average Sunday attendance overall was 58, 255.

In 2017, the ACNA reported 1,037 congregations with a membership of 134,593 and an average Sunday attendance of 93,489. The 2017 average Sunday attendance was an increase from statistics reported in 2009, the year the church was founded when the church reported 703 congregations and an average Sunday attendance of 69,167. However, in 2018, the average Sunday attendance was 88,048. ACNA had a maximum of 30 dioceses, that was reduced to 28, with the withdrawal of the Missionary Diocese of CANA West and the Anglican Diocese of the Trinity to remain solely as Church of Nigeria and Convocation of Anglicans in North America dioceses, on May 23, 2019. ACNA congregations are now organized into the following 28 dioceses and 1 missionary district, Via Apostolica:

Anglican Diocese of All Nations
Missionary Diocese of All Saints
Special Jurisdiction of the Armed Forces and Chaplaincy
Anglican Network in Canada
Diocese of the Carolinas
Diocese of Cascadia
REC Diocese of the Central States
Anglican Diocese of Christ Our Hope 
Diocese of Fort Worth
Anglican Diocese of the Great Lakes (Not to be confused with the older Diocese of the Great Lakes, an autonomous Continuing Anglican jurisdiction.)
Gulf Atlantic Diocese
International Diocese
Anglican Diocese of the Living Word
REC Diocese of Mid-America, with the Convocation of the West and Western Canada
Diocese of the Mid-Atlantic
Anglican Diocese in New England
REC Diocese of the Northeast and Mid-Atlantic, with the Convocation of Eastern Canada
Anglican Diocese of Pittsburgh
Anglican Diocese of the Rocky Mountains
Diocese of Quincy
Diocese of Churches for the Sake of Others
Diocese of San Joaquin
Anglican Diocese of the South
Anglican Diocese of South Carolina
REC Diocese of the Southeast
Anglican Diocese of the Southwest
Anglican Diocese of the Upper Midwest
Diocese of Western Anglicans
Anglican Diocese of the Western Gulf Coast

Ecumenical relations

Anglican churches
The ACNA's constitution expresses the goal to seek recognition as a province of the Anglican Communion. A total of nine Anglican provinces sent formal delegations to the inaugural assembly. The Anglican Church in North America has not yet requested formal recognition by the Anglican Communion office as a province recognized by the Anglican instruments of communion. The office of the Archbishop of Canterbury has said it would possibly take years for the ACNA to gain official recognition from the rest of the Anglican Communion.

In several cases ACNA has become entangled in protracted legal disputes over church property (for example, when the ACNA's Diocese of Fort Worth split from the Episcopal Church's Diocese of Fort Worth), with some of these lawsuits continuing for years.

The Fellowship of Confessing Anglicans primates' council has said that the new church is "fully Anglican" and called for its recognition by existing provinces of the Anglican Communion. Archbishop Robert Duncan was present at the Global South Fourth Encounter that took place in Singapore, in April 2010, where he presided at the Eucharist and met primates and representatives from 20 Anglican provinces. The Global South Encounter final statement declared: "We are grateful that the recently formed Anglican Church in North America (ACNA) is a faithful expression of Anglicanism. We welcomed them as partners in the Gospel and our hope is that all provinces will be in full communion with the clergy and people of the ACNA and the Communion Partners."

In March 2009, the Anglican Church of Nigeria declared itself to be in full communion with the Anglican Church in North America, followed by the House of Bishops of the Anglican Church of Uganda in June 2009 and the Episcopal Church of Sudan in December 2011. Inasmuch as these churches report approximately 30,500,000 members, and the Anglican Communion reports over 80,000,000 members, the ACNA is in communion with churches comprising somewhat over one-third of the membership of the Anglican Communion.

On the final day of its 2009 synod, the Anglican Diocese of Sydney passed a resolution welcoming the creation of the ACNA and expressing a desire to be in full communion. The resolution also called for the diocese's standing committee to seek a general synod motion affirming the Anglican Church of Australia to be in full communion with the ACNA. The Anglican Diocese of Sydney declared itself to be in "full communion" with ACNA during its synod on October 13, 2015.

In 2010, the General Synod of the Church of England affirmed "the desire of those who have formed the Anglican Church in North America to remain within the Anglican family" and called upon the archbishops of Canterbury and York to report back to the synod after further study in 2011. Published in December 2011, the archbishops' follow up report recommended "an open-ended engagement with ACNA on the part of the Church of England and the Communion" but also stated that a definitive outcome would be unclear for sometime.

Archbishop Robert Duncan met following his invitation the Archbishop of Canterbury, Justin Welby, in May 2013, to discuss the recognition of the ACNA ordinations in the near future. Welby announced on January 16, 2014, that Tory Baucum, Rector of Truro Church in Fairfax, Virginia, a parish of the ACNA, had been elected unanimously to serve as one of the Six Preachers of Canterbury Cathedral. Baucum was installed on March 14, 2014, attended by both Justin Welby and Robert Duncan. In October 2014, Welby stated that Tory Baucum had been ordained before ACNA's inception and because of that his Anglican orders were valid, so he was eligible to be elected to that office. He further stated that ACNA was a separate church and not part of the Anglican Communion.

In October 2014, the Diocese of North West Australia passed a motion recognizing the ACNA as a "member church of the Anglican Communion". On October 9, 2014, following the ceremony of investiture of Foley Beach as archbishop and primate of ACNA, an official statement, which recognized Beach as "a fellow Primate of the Anglican Communion", was signed by the seven Anglican archbishops present: Mouneer Anis of Jerusalem and the Middle East, Eliud Wabukala of Kenya, Nicholas Okoh of Nigeria, Stanley Ntagali of Uganda, Onesphore Rwaje of Rwanda, Stephen Than Myint Oo of Myanmar, and Héctor "Tito" Zavala of the Southern Cone of America. However, the authority to decide whether ACNA should be admitted to the worldwide Anglican Communion lies with the Anglican Consultative Council, and not with individual member churches or provinces. Member churches and provinces are, however, able to develop bilateral relations, which do not bind the rest of the Anglican Communion.

At a meeting of the Anglican Primates of the Global South (a coalition representing the majority of the world's Anglicans) on October 14–16, 2015, in Cairo, Egypt, ACNA was declared to be an official partner province of the Global South by representatives of twelve churches, with Archbishop Beach being seated as a member of the Global South Primates Council with voice and vote.

Despite the ACNA not being recognized as a province of the Anglican Communion, Welby invited Beach to attend a gathering of primates in the communion in January 2016. While not permitted to vote, Beach was allowed to attend the first four days of the five-day session. The prospect of the ACNA joining the communion was discussed and it was recognized that if the ACNA were to apply for admission to membership in the communion, the consideration of their application would be within the purview of the Anglican Consultative Council.

The Archbishops of Canterbury and York, Justin Welby and John Sentamu, recognized ACNA's  under the Overseas and Other Clergy (Ministry and Ordination) Measure 1967, as it was announced on 10 February 2017.

After a meeting between Archbishop Foley Beach of ACNA and the Moderator/Primate of the Church of Bangladesh, Paul Sarker, on May 13–15, 2017, at Holy Cross Anglican Cathedral in Loganville, Georgia, they signed a statement affirming and celebrating the communion between both provinces thereby causing ACNA to enter into full communion with the Church of Bangladesh.

In February 2016, Archbishop Foley Beach signed an instrument declaring ACNA to be in full communion with the Free Church of England, a reformed and Protestant Anglican church. Archbishop Beach's declaration was ratified by the Provincial Council of the ACNA in June 2016. The Reformed Episcopal Church, a founding member of the denomination, was already in that status with the FCE since 1927. Foley Beach and Ray Sutton, Presiding Bishop of REC, participated at the celebrations of the 90th anniversary of the communion between FCE and REC, which took place at Wallasey, England, on June 10, 2017.

Fulfilling what Archbishop Foley Beach had already announced on June 8, 2017, on the same day that the Scottish Episcopal Church voted to approve same-sex marriage, Andy Lines was consecrated Missionary Bishop to Europe at ACNA's Third Provincial Assembly meeting in Wheaton, Illinois, on June 30, 2017, on behalf of GAFCON. The consecration was attended by 1,400 Anglican representatives from all over the world, including 11 primates, 3 archbishops, and 13 bishops. The Primates who attended were Nicholas Okoh, from the Church of Nigeria, Stanley Ntagali, from the Church of Uganda, Daniel Deng Bul, from the Province of the Episcopal Church of South Sudan and Sudan, Jacob Chimeledya, from the Anglican Church of Tanzania, Jackson Ole Sapit, from the Anglican Church of Kenya, Onesphore Rwaje, from the Province of the Anglican Church of Rwanda, Masimango Katanda, from the Province of the Anglican Church of the Congo, Daniel Sarfo, from the Church of the Province of West Africa, Gregory Venables, from the Anglican Church of South America, Ng Moon Hing, from the Church of the Province of South East Asia, and Mouneer Anis, retired Presiding Bishop of the Episcopal Church in Jerusalem and the Middle East. This was the largest gathering of worldwide Anglicans that ever participated at a Provincial Assembly of the ACNA.

On December 13, 2017, the Anglican Global South, a grouping of Southern Hemisphere provinces of the Anglican Communion, reaffirmed full communion with the Anglican Church in North America.

The ACNA was represented at GAFCON III, held in Jerusalem, from June 17–22, 2018, by a large delegation from the United States and Canada. At the final of the conference, it was announced that Archbishop Foley Beach will take office as Chairman of the GAFCON's Primates Council in early 2019. After the end of GAFCON III, ACNA held the meeting of their Provincial Council in Jerusalem, for the first time outside North America.

The ACNA endorsed a concordat with the Episcopal Missionary Church, a Continuing Anglican denomination, in January 2020, which was signed by Archbishop Foley Beach and EMC Presiding Bishop William Millsaps on 14 September 2020.

In 2021, the ACNA College of Bishops released a pastoral statement rejecting the use of the phrase "gay Christian," instead recommending the phrase "same-sex attraction," and that restated the church's belief that sex is reserved for marriage between one man and one woman while acknowledging that celibate "same-sex attracted" people can be members of the denomination. This statement divided the ACNA as well as GAFCON, the body of Anglican churches with which the ACNA is affiliated. Within the ACNA, Bishop Todd Hunter of the Diocese of Churches for the Sake of Others (C4SO) released his own pastoral statement in which he used both phrases "gay Christian" and "same-sex attracted," criticizing and departing from the College of Bishops' guidance, and in which he affirmed the membership of those who identify as "gay Christian" pursuing celibacy or "mixed orientation" marriages. Conversely, Archbishop Henry Ndukuba, the Primate of the Church of Nigeria, criticized and rejected the ACNA College of Bishops' pastoral guidance as being too open to homosexuality; Archbishop Ndukuba called on the ACNA to join the Church of Nigeria's "total rejection of homosexuality". These actions received response from the Archbishop of Canterbury, Justin Welby, who released a statement that said people are able to be members of the Anglican Communion "regardless of sexual orientation" and without mention of celibacy.

Archbishops Foley Beach, of the ACNA, and Henry Ndukuba, of the Church of Nigeria, signed a Joint Statement, on 30 March 2021, reaffirming both churches' common stance on human sexuality, as defined by the Lambeth 1998 resolution 1.10, and by the Jerusalem Declaration of 2008, of the Global Anglican Future Conference.

Other churches
At the ACNA's inaugural assembly in June 2009, Metropolitan Jonah of the Orthodox Church in America, who was raised Episcopalian, while recognizing theological differences, said that he was "seeking an ecumenical restoration" between Orthodox and Anglicans in the United States. An agreement was announced between Saint Vladimir's Orthodox Theological Seminary and Nashotah House, an Anglo-Catholic seminary, to guide ecumenical relationships and "new dialogue" between the two churches. Archbishop Foley Beach met Metropolitan Hilarion Alfeyev, Chairman of the Department of External Relations of the Russian Orthodox Church, at an ecumenical meeting that took place at St. Vladimir's Orthodox Theological Seminary in Yonkers, New York, on November 8, 2014. The main purpose of the meeting was the prosecution of the Anglican and Orthodox dialogue in the United States and other parts of the world. Metropolitan Tikhon of the Orthodox Church in America was also present and invited Archbishop Foley Beach to the Orthodox All-American Council, which took place in Atlanta, Georgia, in July 2015.

At the invitation of Patriarch Kirill, Archbishop Beach led a nine-member ACNA delegation to Moscow, Russia, to participate in formal ecumenical meetings with the Russian Orthodox Church. The delegation met Metropolitan Hilarion and was officially received by Patriarch Kirill on August 23, 2015. Both churches expressed their desire to develop and deepen the ecumenical relationships between Orthodox and faithful Anglicans through the world. Archbishop Beach delivered a letter of greeting from Archbishop Eliud Wabukala, Archbishop of Kenya and Chairman of the GAFCON. The ACNA is about to start ecumenical relationships with Patriarch Bartholomew I of Constantinople, due to the mediation of Greek Orthodox Bishop Kyrillos Katerelos.

Archbishop Foley Beach and Bishop Kevin Bond Allen met Patriarch Theophilos III, of the Greek Orthodox Church of Jerusalem, at the Church of the Holy Sepulcher, in Jerusalem, on May 31, 2017.

The ACNA representatives had a meeting with Pope Tawadros II of the Coptic Orthodox Church of Egypt, during his visit to the United States, on October 23, 2015, during which he was presented with a letter of Bishop Todd Hunter, welcoming him and celebrating the recent ecumenical dialogue held between Anglican and Coptic Orthodox churches. Pope Tawadros II met Archbishop Foley Beach and Bishop Charlie Masters, of ACNA, during his meeting with several Global South representatives, in Cairo, in November 2015.

The ACNA established dialogue with several Lutheran groups. In March 2010, the Lutheran Church–Missouri Synod announced that it and the ACNA would hold discussions to "explore dialogue". The ACNA has approved a request from the North American Lutheran Church to share clergy where there are vacancies. In addition, there is a Lutheran group which has requested to be admitted into the ACNA as a diocese.

A "Marriage Summit", was held in Dallas, Texas, May 3–5, 2013, with representatives of ACNA and three Lutheran denominations, the Lutheran Church-Missouri Synod, the Lutheran Church-Canada and the North American Lutheran Church. It resulted in an official joint document, "An Affirmation of Marriage", approved by the heads of all the four church bodies and described as "a strong example of biblical ecumenicism at work", defining the divine nature of "marriage to be the life-long union of one man and one woman".

The ACNA has held ten ecumenical dialogue meetings with the Polish National Catholic Church, since the first, held in Scranton, Pennsylvania, on June 19–20, 2012. The most recent took place at St. Vincent's Cathedral, in Bedford, Texas, on February 15–16, 2017.

The ACNA has been involved with evangelical movements such as the Lausanne Conference on World Evangelism and has observer status with the National Association of Evangelicals. It has also established dialogue with the Charismatic Episcopal Church, the Presbyterian Church in America, the Assemblies of God USA and the United Methodist Church. The ACNA is also partnering with Messianic Jewish groups. The ACNA has also held ecumenical contacts with the Believers Eastern Church, an Evangelical denomination whose headquarters are situated in Kerala, India.

The ACNA has established friendly ecumenical relationships with the Roman Catholic Church. The Catholic Church was represented by Bishop Kevin Vann at their inaugural Provincial Assembly, in Bedford, Texas, on June 22, 2009. In October 2009, ACNA's leadership reacted to the Roman Catholic Church's proposed creation of personal ordinariates for disaffected traditionalist Anglicans by stating that although they believe that this provision will not be utilized by the great majority of its laity and clergy, they will happily bless those who are drawn to participate in this proposal. The ACNA expressed its support for the Catholic Church's opposition to the 2012 US Health and Human Services' contraceptive mandate, with Archbishop Robert Duncan being one of the signatories of the statement of the Christian Associates of Southwest Pennsylvania, representing 26 Christian denominations, on April 13, 2012. Archbishop Duncan and Bishop Ray Sutton were also invited to the weekly private audience by Pope Benedict XVI, which took place in Rome, on November 28, 2012, whom they meet and greet afterwards on behalf of the ACNA and the Fellowship of Confessing Anglicans. The ACNA Provincial Assembly, which reunited more than 900 participants, and their College of Bishops conclave, which elected Foley Beach as the second Archbishop of the province, took place at the Roman Catholic Benedictine St. Vincent Archabbey Basilica, in Latrobe, Pennsylvania, on June 19–21, 2014, due to the kind permission of Archabbot Douglas Robert Nowicki, a personal friend of Archbishop Duncan. Archbishop Wilton Daniel Gregory of the Roman Catholic Archdiocese of Atlanta offered Foley Beach an African-made crozier, which he used at his investiture ceremony, that took place at the Church of the Apostles, in Atlanta, Georgia, at October 9, 2014. Former Archbishop Gregory Venables of the Anglican Church of the Southern Cone of America read at the ceremony a message by his personal friend Pope Francis, who sent Archbishop Foley Beach his "personal greetings and congratulations as he leads his church in the very important job of revival" and asked Archbishop Venables to embrace him on his behalf.

The ACNA has started official talks with the United States Conference of Catholic Bishops. Bishop Ray Sutton, Provincial Dean for Ecumenical Affairs led the team that met with a USCCB delegation, led by Bishop Mitchell T. Rozanski, Chair of Ecumenical and Interreligious Affairs, in Chicago, Illinois, on October 12, 2016.

In January 2020, the ACNA endorsed a concordat with the Philippine Independent Catholic Church (formally known as the "International Conference of Philippine Independent Catholic Churches of Jesus Christ" since 2019), a breakaway faction from the Philippine Independent Church, in a meeting held in Melbourne, Florida, which was meant to be presented for approval by the Provincial Council in June that year. Later in the same year, the endorsement was approved and both churches signed a concordat of understanding.

Interfaith
In August 2010, the executive committee approved the creation of a task force on "Islam and interfaith engagement". Regarding the task force, Julian Dobbs, a member of the ACNA College of Bishops and Missionary Bishop of the Convocation of Anglicans in North America, stated, "we need to undertake a prayerful, sensitive and honest approach to the issues involved".

In its 2011 annual report, the ACNA said it was forming partnerships with Messianic Jewish groups to proselytize.

Archbishop Foley Beach and Bishop Charlie Masters, of ACNA, met the Grand Imam of Al-Azhar, Ahmed el-Tayeb, when he welcomed a delegation of several Global South representatives during their visit to Egypt in November 2015. Ahmed el-Tayeb expressed the "importance of the partnership and collegiality between religious leaders for the common good of humanity" and his solidarity with the Anglican realignment. He also stated that Christians and Muslims should be united in their opposition to the pressure for the acceptance of same-sex marriage and homosexual practice, especially in the western world.

He visited Pakistan in November 2019, at invitation of the Kul Masalak Ulama Board Leadership, where he attended an interfaith gathering with Muslim scholars, in Lahore, on 19 November 2019.

In the wake of the terrorist attack to the Tree of Life Synagogue, in Pittsburgh, on October 27, 2018, Archbishop Beach expressed his full solidarity with the Jewish communities of the United States and endorsed the "ShowUpForShabbat" initiative by which ACNA parish members were to attend local synagogues for the Shabbat.

See also
 List of bishops of the Anglican Church in North America
:Category:American Anglican Church in North America members

References

Citations

Sources

External links

 

 
Anglicanism in Canada
Anglicanism in the United States
Anglican realignment denominations
Christian organizations established in 2009
Anglican denominations established in the 21st century